Chionomus puellus is a species of delphacid planthopper in the family Delphacidae. It is found in the Caribbean, Central America, North America, and South America.

This species was formerly a member of the genus Delphacodes. As a result of genomic research published in 2020, it was transferred to the genus Chionomus along with several other species.

References

External links

 

Delphacini
Articles created by Qbugbot
Insects described in 1897